Gelbakh is a rural locality (a selo) in Kizilyurtovsky District, Republic of Dagestan, Russia. The population was 1,473 as of 2010. There are 33 streets.

Geography 
Gelbakh is located 9 km south of Kizilyurt (the district's administrative centre) by road. Bavtugay and Nizhny Chiryurt are the nearest rural localities.

Nationalities 
Avars live there.

References 

Rural localities in Kizilyurtovsky District